Hixkaryana  is one of the Cariban languages, spoken by just over 500 people on the Nhamundá River, a tributary of the Amazon River in Brazil. It is one of around a dozen languages that are described as having object–verb–subject word order (initially by linguist Desmond C. Derbyshire).

Phonology

Hixkaryana has the following consonant phonemes:

  is a retroflex tap with a lateral release.

Hixkaryana has the following vowel phonemes:

Grammar

In Hixkaryana, arguments are indexed on the verb by means of person prefixes.  These prefixes form an inverse-like pattern in which the argument highest in the hierarchy 2nd > 1st > 3rd is indexed on the verb.  If the object of a transitive verb outranks the subject according to this hierarchy, the appropriate O-prefix is used; otherwise, an A-prefix is used.

Intransitive verbs take prefixes mostly similar to the transitive prefixes given above, with an active–stative.  The arguments' grammatical number is indexed on the verb by means of portmanteau suffixes that combine tense, aspect, mood, and number.

In most cases, the person prefixes unambiguously determine which of the arguments is the subject and which is the object.  When both the subject and the object are third person, however, the person prefix is inadequate to fully determine the identity of the arguments.  In these situations, therefore, word order is crucial in determining their identity. Hixkaryana may have an object–verb–subject word order. The example below, "toto yonoye kamara", cannot be given the AVO reading "the man ate the jaguar"; the OVA reading – "the jaguar ate the man" – is the only possible one.

Indirect objects, however, follow the subject:

Moreover, word order in non-finite embedded clauses is SOV.   Like most other languages with objects preceding the verb, it is postpositional.

References

External links
Metathesis in Hixkaryana
Hixkaryana in SAILS database on South American languages

Languages of Brazil
Object–verb–subject languages
Cariban languages